Donner Lake is a freshwater lake in Northeast California on the eastern slope of the Sierra Nevada and about  northwest of the much larger Lake Tahoe. A moraine serves as a natural dam for the lake. The lake is located in the town of Truckee, between Interstate 80 to the north and Schallenberger Ridge to the south.  The tracks of the Union Pacific Railroad run along
Schallenberger Ridge and closely follow the route of the original transcontinental railroad. The historic route of the Lincoln Highway, the first automobile road across America and US 40 follows the northern shoreline, then climbs to Donner Pass from where the entire lake may be viewed.

Both the lake and the pass were named after the ill-fated Donner Party, which wintered involuntarily near the lake in 1846. Donner Memorial State Park is on the east end of the lake and provides campsites with access to several different beaches. There are also various hiking trails in the park.

Fishing 

Donner Lake holds some of the biggest lake trout in the state. There is also a good population of rainbow and brown trout as well as Kokanee salmon. Fisherman use downriggers and troll with plugs for Kokanee salmon and rainbow trout in order to catch the trophy-sized lake trout. During the spring and fall lake trout come to the top to feed, and these are the only times of year one has the chance to hook a laker in shallow water.

A public boat ramp operated by the Truckee Donner Recreation & Parks District is available in the northwest corner of Donner Lake. A fee is charged for boat launching. The lake is open to both powerboats and sailboats.

The California Office of Environmental Health Hazard Assessment (OEHHA) has developed an advisory for Donner Lake based on mercury and PCBs found in fish caught from this water body. The advisory provides safe eating advice for fish species caught in the body of water.

Recreation 

Donner Memorial State Park wraps around the East and part of the South shore of the Lake, encompassing Scallenberger Ridge to the south. Summer activities include: camping, picnicking, boating, fishing, water-skiing, wind-surfing, hiking, and mountain biking. Winter activities include cross-country skiing and snowshoeing. The Park features the Pioneer Monument - welcoming visitors year round - which was built to commemorate the Donner Party traveling to California from the east in the mid-19th century.

The North shore of the Lake hosts  of public docks for both swimmers and boaters.

Hiking
Visitors can legally park in Coldstream Canyon (just past the 76 gas station) which contains the alignment of the primary Emigrant Trail, which leads up to U.S. Forest Service and the Pacific Crest trails beyond the park. Donner Lake is roughly  around which also makes for a great hike.

Camping
There are 154 sites to camp at in the park and a day-use area along the lake. A lakeside interpretive trail has 18 panels which discuss the natural and cultural resources in the local area.

See also 
 List of dams and reservoirs in California
 List of lakes in California

References

External links

Trailspotting: Donner Memorial State Park Trail Hike description & photos
California State Parks:Donner Lake
Views of Donner Lake, California. Photographed by R.J. Waters and Co., ca. 1915, The Bancroft Library
Change of Pace
Pipeline spill of diesel fuel into Donner Lake settlement

Donner Party
Lakes of California
Lakes of Nevada County, California
Tourist attractions in Nevada County, California
Lakes of Northern California
Stephens–Townsend–Murphy Party